Zhong Juzhan (born 29 April 1993) is a Chinese footballer who currently plays for Hebei China Fortune in the Chinese Super League.

Club career 
Zhong Juzhan started his football career in the 2011 season when he played for China League Two team Guangzhou Youth. He moved to another League Two team Guangdong Youth in 2012 after Guangzhou Youth was dissolved by Guangzhou Evergrande. He was promoted to China League One side Guangdong Sunray Cave in the 2014 season. On 15 March 2014, he made his debut for Guangdong in a 2–2 home draw against Hebei Zhongji.

Zhong transferred to Hebei China Fortune after Guangdong Sunray Cave dissolved in 2015. He was promoted to the first team in the summer of 2016. Zhong made his debut for Hebei on 29 June 2016 in the fourth round of 2016 Chinese FA Cup against Shijiazhuang Ever Bright with a 3–2 win.

Career statistics 
.

References 

Living people
1993 births
Association football defenders
Chinese footballers
Footballers from Guangzhou
Guangdong Sunray Cave players
Hebei F.C. players
Chinese Super League players
China League One players